Gunnar Kroge (18 October 1930 – 24 January 2000) was a Norwegian ice hockey player, born in Oslo, Norway. He played for the Norwegian national ice hockey team, and  participated at the 1952 Winter Olympics in Oslo, where the Norwegian team placed 9th.

References

External links

1930 births
2000 deaths
Ice hockey players at the 1952 Winter Olympics
Norwegian ice hockey players
Olympic ice hockey players of Norway
Ice hockey people from Oslo